= Margaux (musician) =

- Born: Margaux Bouchegnies; February 3, 1999 (age 27)
- Origin: Seattle, Washington
- Genres: Indie rock
- Years active: 2019–present
- Member of: Closebye
- Website: https://margauxtosleep.bandcamp.com/

Margaux Bouchegnies, better known by just her first name, is an American indie folk musician from Seattle, Washington, now based in New York City. Bouchegnies is also a member of the New York City based band Closebye.

== History ==
Margaux attended The New School, originally to study jazz but ending up graduating with a degree in poetry and non-fiction. Margaux released her debut EP in 2019, titled More Brilliant Is the Hand that Throws the Coin. In 2024, Margaux released her debut album titled Inside the Marble. The album received positive reviews.

== Discography ==
Studio albums

- Inside the Marble (2024, Massif Records)

EPs

- More Brilliant Is the Hand that Throws the Coin (2019, Massif Records)
